”Like to the Damask Rose” is a poem either by Francis Quarles called "Hos ego versiculos", or by Simon Wastell called “The flesh profiteth nothing”. It was set to music by the English composer Edward Elgar in 1892.

The song, together with Through the Long Days, was first performed by Charles Phillips in St. James's Hall on 25 February 1897.

It was first published (Tuckwood, Ascherberg) in 1893, and re-published by Boosey in 1907 as one of the Seven Lieder of Edward Elgar, with English and German words.

The 'damask rose' (Damascus rose) of the title is the common name of Rosa × damascena.

Lyrics
Elgar made a few changes to the original words.

Recordings
Songs and Piano Music by Edward Elgar has "Like to the Damask Rose" performed by Amanda Pitt (soprano), with David Owen Norris (piano).
Elgar: Complete Songs for Voice & Piano Konrad Jarnot (baritone), Reinild Mees (piano)
The Songs of Edward Elgar SOMM CD 220 Neil Mackie (tenor) with Malcolm Martineau (piano), at Southlands College, London, April 1999

References

Banfield, Stephen, Sensibility and English Song: Critical studies of the early 20th century (Cambridge University Press, 1985) 
Kennedy, Michael, Portrait of Elgar (Oxford University Press, 1968) 
Moore, Jerrold N. “Edward Elgar: a creative life” (Oxford University Press, 1984)

External links

Notes

Songs by Edward Elgar
1892 songs